Chhota Bheem & Ganesh is an Indian animated movie featuring Bheem, the star of the Indian television cartoon program Chhota Bheem, and Ganesh, the star of the program Bal Ganesh. It was the second movie of the Chhota Bheem movie series. Its runtime is 22 minutes.

Plot
Dholakpur is suddenly attacked by two fire-breathing monsters. As they breathe fire and create havoc, The King  places the responsibility of saving his kingdom on the mighty Chhota Bheem`s shoulders. Meanwhile, Bheem and his friends save the life of a mouse who happens to be a Mushaak, Lord Ganesh's companion mouse.
But due to some unfortunate events, Mushik is kidnapped by the dragons. Lord Ganesh comes down on earth to help his companion. He and Bheem pair up against the dragons to save Dholakpur.

Characters
 Bheem
 Lord Ganesha
 Mushik
 Chutki
 Raju
 Jaggu
 Kalia
 Dholu-Bholu

Reception
Reception for the movie was generally positive. It followed the trend of featuring two stars from different series into one movie, first started by its predecessor Chhota Bheem Aur Krishna. Its success, however, was overlapped by that of the following movies Chhota Bheem & Krishna: Pataliputra- City of the Dead and Chhota Bheem: Bheem vs Aliens, released shortly thereafter.

See also
Chhota Bheem
Chhota Bheem Aur Krishna
Chhota Bheem: Bheem vs Aliens
Chhota Bheem: Journey To Petra
Chhota Bheem & Krishna: Pataliputra- City of the Dead
Chhota Bheem: Master of Shaolin
Chhota Bheem: Dholakpur to Kathmandu

References

Indian animated films
Pogo (TV channel) television films
2009 television films
2009 films